Joe Grimaldi may refer to:

 Joseph Grimaldi (1778–1837), English comic theatre star, especially in the harlequinade
 Joe Grimaldi (ice hockey) (born 1986), American ice hockey defenceman
 Joe Grimaldi, Canadian sound engineer who has been nominated for and won the Canadian Screen Award for Best Sound Mixing